Bafutia tenuicaulis is a species of flowering plant in the family Asteraceae, and the only species in the genus Bafutia. It is found in Cameroon and Nigeria, where it lives in rocky areas.

References

Further reading

External links

Senecioneae
Monotypic Asteraceae genera
Flora of Cameroon
Flora of Nigeria
Near threatened plants
Taxonomy articles created by Polbot